The 2014 Rugby Football League Championship, known as the Kingstone Press Championship due to sponsorship reasons, was a semi-professional rugby league football competition played in the UK, one tier below the first tier Super League. The 2014 season was the second and final season to consist of a 14-team division following the expansion of the league in 2013.

Relegation to Championship 1 was in place for the 2014 season, along with the play-offs with the format for the play-offs remaining the same with no promotion to the Super League. With two Super League teams relegated in 2014 and the Championship reduced to 12 teams in 2015, as part of the reform of the leagues, five teams were relegated at the end of the regular season with one team promoted at the end of 2014 Championship 1.

Teams
The competition featured 12 of the 14 teams from 2013 plus the Champions and Play-off winner of the 2013 Championship 1 season, which were North Wales Crusaders and Rochdale Hornets. Hunslet Hawks and York City Knights, who finished in the bottom two in 2013 were relegated into Championship 1.

Season Standings

Season Results

The regular league season saw the 14 teams play each other twice (one home, one away) over 26 matches. The top eight teams at the end of the regular season went through to the play-offs to determine the winners of the Championship.

See also
 Championship
 2014 Championship 1
 British rugby league system
 Super League
 Rugby League Conference
 Northern Ford Premiership
 National League Cup
 Rugby League Reserve Team Championship

References

External links
Official Website

2014 in English rugby league
2014 in Welsh rugby league
Rugby Football League Championship